Gemerské Michalovce is a village and municipality in the Rimavská Sobota District of the Banská Bystrica Region of southern Slovakia.

History
In historical records the village was first mentioned in 1413 (Mychalfalwa). From 1938 to 1945 it belonged to Hungary.

Genealogical resources

The records for genealogical research are available at the state archive "Statny Archiv in Banska Bystrica, Slovakia"

 Roman Catholic church records (births/marriages/deaths): 1829-1887 (parish B)
 Lutheran church records (births/marriages/deaths): 1730-1895 (parish B)
 Reformated church records (births/marriages/deaths): 1731-1898 (parish B)

Twin towns
  Tök, Hungary (2022)

See also
 List of municipalities and towns in Slovakia

External links
https://web.archive.org/web/20080111223415/http://www.statistics.sk/mosmis/eng/run.html 
http://www.e-obce.sk/obec/gemerskemichalovce/gemerske-michalovce.html
Surnames of living people in Gemerske Michalovce

Villages and municipalities in Rimavská Sobota District